Lee Jian Yi (born 25 April 1995) is a Malaysian badminton player. He and his partner, Lim Zhen Ting reached a career-high ranking of 79 in the men's doubles discipline.

Career 
In 2016, he partnered with Lim and were semifinalists at the Vietnam International Series. Months later, they reached the final of the Indonesia International Challenge but lost out to their compatriots, Chooi Kah Ming and Low Juan Shen.

He reached two finals in 2017, the Lao International and the Malaysia International Series. They won their first title in the Malaysia International. In 2019, they were semifinalists at the Malaysian National Circuit Grand Prix Finals.

Achievements

BWF International Challenge/Series (1 title, 2 runners-up) 
Men's doubles

  BWF International Challenge tournament
  BWF International Series tournament
  BWF Future Series tournament

References

External links 
 

Living people
1995 births
People from Selangor
Malaysian male badminton players
Malaysian sportspeople of Chinese descent
21st-century Malaysian people